The 1904 Kilkenny Senior Hurling Championship was the 16th staging of the Kilkenny Senior Hurling Championship since its establishment by the Kilkenny County Board.

Tullaroan won the championship after a 6-14 to 1-06 defeat of Piltown in the final. This was their eighth championship title overall and their first title in two championship seasons.

Results

Final

References

Kilkenny Senior Hurling Championship
Kilkenny Senior Hurling Championship